Milk Bar (originally Momofuku Milk Bar) is a chain of dessert and bakery restaurants in the United States, founded by chef Christina Tosi. The chain has branches in New York City, Los Angeles, Washington D.C., Boston, Las Vegas, and Toronto.

Tosi owns the chain along with investors. She is the primary recipe developer of Milk Bar's products.

History
Christina Tosi was working as pastry chef for David Chang's Momofuku restaurants in 2008 when Momofuku's Ssäm Bar decided to expand into a neighboring vacant laundromat; Tosi proposed the idea to add a bakery. Chang provided seed money, and the first Momofuku Milk Bar opened in November 2008. Tosi created the logo herself in Brush Script Medium. 

By 2012, Milk Bar had discontinued the use of "Momofuku" in its name and was operating several locations in New York City in addition to the original bakery in Manhattan's East Village. Since then, it has opened locations in Toronto, Washington, D.C., the Cosmopolitan of Las Vegas, Los Angeles, and Boston.

As of February 2019, Milk Bar employed 381 people at its various locations. The management team is almost all women. 

In 2019, Milk Bar changed the name of its signature crack pie to Milk Bar Pie, following criticism in the Boston Globe and other press concerning its allusion to the addictiveness of crack cocaine.

In the spring of 2020, Milk Bar began to sell cookies through online and national retail food stores.

Milk Bar operates separately from Momofuku, although Chang remains a business partner. In 2017, the bakery received a $10 million investment from venture capital fund RSE Ventures

Publications
Several cookbooks featuring recipes from the restaurant have been released, including Momofuku Milk Bar (2011), Milk Bar Life: Recipes & Stories (2015), Milk Bar: All About Cake (2018), Milk Bar: Kids Only (2020), and Every Cake Has a Story (2021).

Recognition 
Trade magazine QSR in 2019 named Milk Bar to its list of most innovative fast-casual start-ups.

References

External links

 

Bakeries of the United States
Restaurants in Manhattan
Restaurants established in 2008
2008 establishments in New York City